Dinartamus is an extinct genus of titanosuchian therapsids.

This genus is only known through poor fossil record, therefore there are few diagnostic characters known which are merely sufficient for classifying it as a titanosuchian.

References

Tapinocephalians
Prehistoric therapsid genera
Permian synapsids of Africa